Gabriel Pomerand (c. 1926 - 1972) was a French poet, artist and a co-founder of lettrism. He was born in Paris and moved to Alsace at a young age, and then on to Marseille where he worked as a student for the Resistance. His mother was deported to Auschwitz, yet he survived.

After the war, he moved back to Paris. Here he met Isidore Isou, with whom he founded the lettrist movement.  He wrote Saint Ghetto of the Loans, a book of "politically charged urban rebuses", in 1950. Isou expelled him from the movement in 1956, after which he turned to opium. He committed suicide in 1972 in Corsica.

References

External links
Gabriel Pomerand on LeLettrisme.com

1920s births
1972 suicides
20th-century French painters
20th-century French male artists
French male painters
Lettrism
Writers from Paris
Writers from Marseille
20th-century French poets
French male poets
20th-century male writers
20th-century French male writers
1972 deaths
Suicides in France
French Jews